The 2004 Cotton Bowl Classic was a post-season college football bowl game between the Oklahoma State Cowboys and the Ole Miss Rebels on January 2, 2004, at the Cotton Bowl in Dallas, Texas. It was the final game of the 2003 NCAA Division I-A football season for each team and resulted in a 31–28 Ole Miss victory. Ole Miss represented the Southeastern Conference (SEC) while Oklahoma State represented the Big 12 Conference. It was Ole Miss's first January bowl victory since the 1970 Sugar Bowl and first Cotton Bowl Classic appearance since 1962.

Game summary
Ole Miss quarterback Eli Manning completed 21 of 33 pass attempts, threw for two touchdowns, and he ran for one additional touchdown to lead the Rebels to a Cotton Bowl Classic win in a game that was not decided until the final minutes as the Rebels built a 31–14 lead, then held on after the Cowboys made it 31–28 with 4:38 to go. Vernand Morency had two touchdowns for OSU.

References

Cotton Bowl Classic
Cotton Bowl Classic
Oklahoma State Cowboys football bowl games
Ole Miss Rebels football bowl games
January 2004 sports events in the United States
2004 in sports in Texas
2000s in Dallas
2004 in Texas